Alicia Craig, also known as Alicia Shay (born June 14, 1982, in Gillette, Wyoming), is an American distance runner. She is a two-time NCAA 10,000 meter champion. In 2004, she set the women's collegiate 10,000-meter record in just her third race. She ran at Stanford University. Her husband Ryan Shay died November 3, 2007, while competing in the 2008 Olympic Marathon Trials.

Honors 
2004 Broke the NCAA women's record in the 10,000 meters
2004 All American in track and cross country
2003 All American in track and cross country
2002 Pac-10 and West Region Athlete of the Year
2002 All American in cross country
High School four time All-state athlete in Gillette, WY

References

External links
Go Stanford Bio
Fast Women
Sports Illustrated article
2012 Interview

1982 births
Living people
Stanford Cardinal women's track and field athletes
People from Gillette, Wyoming
American female long-distance runners
Stanford Cardinal women's cross country runners
21st-century American women